Tarot Classics is an EP by Florida-based indie rock band Surfer Blood released on October 25, 2011, on Kanine Records. It is their last release for Kanine.

Reception

Tarot Classics received generally favorable reviews from music critics.

Track listing
All songs written by John Paul Pitts, Thomas Fekete, Tyler Schwarz and Kevin Williams, except as noted.
I'm Not Ready (John Paul Pitts, Thomas Fekete, Tyler Schwarz)
Miranda
Voyager Reprise
Drinking Problem
Voyager Reprise (Another Summer of Love Remix)
Drinking Problem (Speculator Remix)

References

2011 EPs
Surfer Blood albums
Kanine Records EPs